Cornick is a surname. Notable people with the surname include:

Andrew Cornick (born 1981), Welsh field hockey player
Glenn Cornick (1947-2014), British bass player
Paul Cornick (born 1989), American football player

Cornick can also refer to:
Cornick (food), also spelled kornik or cornic a Filipino corn nut snack

See also
Lemuel Cornick Shepherd Jr. (1896-1990), American general